Stanley Holroyd "Stan" Chambers (August 11, 1923 – February 13, 2015) was an American television reporter who worked for KTLA in Los Angeles from 1947 to 2010.

Chambers was born in Los Angeles. His career began shortly after KTLA became the first commercially licensed TV station in the western United States. His April 1949 on-scene 27½-hour report of the unsuccessful attempt to rescue Kathy Fiscus from an abandoned well in San Marino, California, prompted the sale of hundreds of TV sets in the Los Angeles area. His report has been recognized as the first live coverage of a breaking news story.

In 1952, Chambers was involved in the first live telecast of an atomic bomb test at the Nevada Test Site. Among other stories he covered were the 1961 Bel Air fires, the 1963 Baldwin Hills Reservoir dam break, the 1971 Sylmar and 1994 Northridge earthquakes, the 1963 kidnapping of Frank Sinatra Jr., the 1965 Watts Riots, the assassination of Robert F. Kennedy, the Tate-LaBianca murders by the Manson family, and the Hillside Strangler. Chambers broke the story on the beating of Rodney King by Los Angeles Police Department officers.

Chambers earned several Emmy Awards, Golden Mike Awards, LA City and County Proclamations, an LA Press Club Award, and a star on the Hollywood Walk of Fame. His grandson, Jaime Chambers, became a reporter at KTLA in 2003, and now works at KSWB-TV (Fox-5) in San Diego.

Retirement years and death
Chambers retired on August 11, 2010, on his 87th birthday, marking 63 years as a reporter at KTLA.

He died on February 13, 2015, at his home in the Holmby Hills neighborhood of Los Angeles at the age of 91.

Chambers was predeceased by his first wife Beverly, who died of cancer in 1989. He was survived by his second wife GiGi, 11 children, 38 grandchildren and 8 great-grandchildren.

Stan Chambers is interred at Holy Cross Cemetery in Culver City, California, beside his beloved wife Beverly.

References

External links

 
 Stan Chambers, KTLA.com, accessed 2013-10-13
 
 

1923 births
2015 deaths
American television journalists
American reporters and correspondents
Journalists from California
Emmy Award winners
University of Southern California alumni
Television anchors from Los Angeles
People from Los Angeles
American male journalists
People from Holmby Hills, Los Angeles